Reactions to the 2019 UK Conservative Party leadership election emerged from around the world, including from states, other institutions, and people. The result of the election, held following the resignation of Theresa May as Leader of the Conservative Party, was announced on 23 July, with Boris Johnson chosen by party members to succeed May. Johnson consequently also succeeded May as Prime Minister of the United Kingdom the following day.

Domestic

Conservative Party 
Outgoing party leader and British prime minister Theresa May pledged her full support for her successor and called for the rest of the party to unite behind Johnson.

Johnson's opponent Jeremy Hunt commended Johnson on his victory and praised his "optimism, energy and unbounded confidence [in Britain]." In an interview following the announcement of the result, Hunt said that he believed that his support for Remain during the 2016 Brexit referendum was the main reason for his defeat.

Ministerial resignations 
In anticipation of Johnson's election, a number of ministers announced that they would resign from office, due to his willingness to leave the EU without a deal. On 22 July, Foreign Minister Alan Duncan tendered his resignation; prior to the leadership election result announced on the following day, Education Minister Anne Milton stood down from her post, citing "grave concerns" over the new Prime Minister's Brexit policies.

On 24 July, the Chancellor Philip Hammond, Justice Secretary David Gauke and International Development Secretary Rory Stewart all resigned from the May government, just hours before Boris Johnson became Prime Minister. This was done in protest against Johnson's position on withdrawing from the European Union, and in anticipation of their dismissal from office during the formation of a new cabinet.

Democratic Unionist Party 
DUP leader Arlene Foster welcomed Johnson's election, reaffirming the continuity of the Conservative–DUP agreement.

Opposition parties

Labour 
Labour leader Jeremy Corbyn criticised Johnson's mandate and priorities for government. He restated his call for a new general election.

Scottish National Party 
Scottish National Party Commons leader Ian Blackford warned of a "bleak Boris Johnson Brexit Britain." He urged the new Prime Minister to avoid building a "bunker-mentality government" and put the national interest first by ruling out leaving the EU without a deal.

Liberal Democrats 
Liberal Democrat leader Jo Swinson declared Johnson "unfit" to serve as Prime Minister. Referring to his controversial treatment of Ambassador Kim Darroch and the £350 million spending pledge during the Brexit referendum campaign, Swinson stated: "Whether it is throwing people under the bus or writing a lie on the side of one: Britain deserves better than Boris Johnson."

Change UK 
Change UK leader Anna Soubry wrote an article for The Guardian in which she described Johnson as a "clown prince" who had been crowned by a party "captured" by the hard right.

Plaid Cymru 
Plaid Cymru Commons leader Liz Saville Roberts called Johnson a "clown" but added that his election was a "gift" to the Welsh independence movement.

Devolved administrations

Scotland 
First Minister Nicola Sturgeon expressed her "profound concerns" at Johnson leading the country. She questioned his lack of principle and pledged to work with other parties to prevent Britain leaving the EU without a deal.

Wales 
First Minister Mark Drakeford urged Johnson to demonstrate his "seriousness" and "maturity" when he comes to address the issues facing the country. Drakeford also called for a further referendum if Johnson is unable to pass a deal that commands the support of the House of Commons.

Overseas territories

Bermuda 
Premier Edward David Burt commented that "with the election of Mr Johnson as the leader of his party and his eventual appointment as Prime Minister, I fully expect that this productive working relationship will continue."

Cayman Islands 
Premier Alden McLaughlin congratulated Johnson, stating that "I look forward to the Joint Ministerial Council Conference in London in November this year when we will have the opportunity to meet with members of Mr. Johnson's government to discuss matters of common interest between the UK and the Cayman Islands."

Falkland Islands 
In a statement on Twitter, the Falkland Islands Government congratulated Johnson, commenting "We look forward to engaging with you on of issues of importance to #Falklands & when it comes to Brexit a good deal for the UK is also a good deal for #Falklands."

Gibraltar 
Chief Minister Fabian Picardo congratulated Johnson on his appointment, wishing him "every success in your term of office."

Crown dependencies

Guernsey 
Policy and Resources Committee president, Gavin St Pier, congratulated Johnson, stating "I very much look forward to working closely with the new Prime Minister's government and look to build on the already strong relationship we have developed with his predecessors over recent decades."

Jersey 
Chief Minister John Le Fondré congratulated Johnson, stating he was "confident #JerseyCI's strong relationship with the UK will continue under his leadership and that our interests will continue to be understood and represented."

Isle of Man 
Chief Minister Howard Quayle stated "I look forward to continuing the strong working relationship between the governments of the Isle of Man and the United Kingdom so that our voice is heard."

International

Americas

Brazil 
President Jair Bolsonaro praised Johnson's elected "laudable commitment to respect the designs of the British people."

Canada 
 Prime Minister Justin Trudeau tweeted his congratulations, saying that he looked forward to maintaining the "close friendship between Canada and the UK."
 Leader of the Opposition Andrew Scheer congratulated Johnson, stating "I am hopeful we'll be able to work together to increase trade and create opportunity for all people in both Canada and the UK."
 Ontarian Premier Doug Ford described Johnson as a "no-nonsense type of person" who would succeed in fixing the "nightmare" situation facing Britain.

United States 
 President Donald Trump tweeted his congratulations to Johnson, saying that [Johnson] "will be great" as Prime Minister. During a speech later that day, he nicknamed him, "Britain Trump."
 Ivanka Trump, daughter of Donald Trump, mistakenly congratulated Johnson on "becoming the next Prime Minister of the United Kingston." The tweet was since deleted, but she received considerable media attention for the mistake.

Asia

India 
 Prime Minister Narendra Modi tweeted Johnson his congratulations, stating "I wish you success and look forward to working with you to further strengthen India – UK partnership in all spheres."

Israel 

 Prime Minister Benjamin Netanyahu said that he looked forward to "facing our common challenges and seizing the opportunities ahead."
President Reuven Rivlin congratulated Johnson, tweeting that "excellent bilateral relations between our two countries will go from strength to strength."
Foreign Minister Israel Katz greeted Johnson's victory with the tweet: "Mazal Tov to @BorisJohnson on becoming UK Prime Minister."

Iran 
Foreign Minister Mohammad Javad Zarif stated that he hoped that Johnson's election would result in an improved relationship between the two nations. He stressed that although his country did not seek a confrontation with Britain, he warned that Iran will continue to "protect" its waters along the Persian Gulf coastline.

Japan 
Prime Minister Shinzō Abe stated that he hoped to cooperate closely with Johnson. He also expressed his preference for Britain to withdraw from the EU with a deal, as it would minimise Brexit's negative impact on Japanese companies.

Pakistan 
 Prime Minister Imran Khan tweeted Johnson his congratulations, stating "Congratulations Rt. Hon. Boris Johnson MP on your election as Conservative Party Leader & on assuming PM's Office. I am confident that under your leadership not only the UK & its people will prosper but our bilateral relations will also flourish. I look forward to working with you."

Turkey 
President Recep Tayyip Erdoğan wished Johnson success in his new position. He also stated his belief that relations between Turkey and Britain would improve under Johnson's premiership.

Europe

France 
President Emmanuel Macron reacted to Johnson's election at a press conference in Paris. He stated that he looked forward to working with the new Prime Minister on Brexit negotiations and other international issues.

Germany 
Chancellor Angela Merkel released a statement through her deputy spokesperson, saying that she looked forward to working with Johnson and hoped that the two countries would continue to develop their "close friendship."

Ireland 
 Taoiseach Leo Varadkar tweeted that he looked forward to "early engagement" with Johnson on Brexit, Northern Ireland and bilateral relations.
 Tánaiste Simon Coveney promised that he would "work constructively with [Johnson] and his government to maintain and strengthen British-Irish relations through the challenges of Brexit."

Italy 
 Prime Minister Giuseppe Conte said that Italy would work with Johnson to ensure that Britain remains an "important and reliable partner of the European Union."
 Deputy Prime Minister Matteo Salvini congratulated Johnson. He tweeted that Tony Blair's description of Johnson as "more dangerous than the Lega" makes him more "likeable."

Oceania

Australia 
 Prime Minister Scott Morrison congratulated Johnson, and said that he looked forward to meeting him at the upcoming G7 summit in Biarritz.
 Foreign Minister Marise Payne paid tribute to Jeremy Hunt's unsuccessful campaign and said she looked forward to further developing the "dynamic and enduring partnership" between Australia and Britain.
 Former Prime Minister Tony Abbott congratulated Johnson and said that Johnson had the courage and the passion to keep Britain great.

New Zealand 
 Prime Minister Jacinda Ardern congratulated Johnson via text message, and said that regardless of the Brexit outcome New Zealand would be ready to begin free trade talks as soon as the United Kingdom was in a position to do so.
 Leader of the Opposition Simon Bridges welcomed Johnson's election and said that he would be "good for New Zealand."

International organizations

European Union 
 European Council President-Elect Charles Michel tweeted his congratulations, noting the important challenge of Brexit.
 European Commission President Jean-Claude Juncker wrote to Johnson, sending his "warmest congratulations." Commission President-Elect Ursula von der Leyen also congratulated Johnson but added that there were "difficult issues" that would need to be resolved between Europe and Britain.

Business and financial markets 
Moody's and Goldman Sachs both warned that the election of Boris Johnson would increase the likelihood of the exit of Britain from the European Union without a deal. Dame Carolyn Fairbairn, the Director-General of the CBI reacted to the result by urging the new Prime Minister to secure a deal, to "unlock new investment and confidence in factories and boardrooms across the country."

See also 
 Opinion polling for the 2019 Conservative Party leadership election

References 

2019 Conservative Party (UK) leadership election
July 2019 events in the United Kingdom
International reactions to elections
Boris Johnson
Conservative Party leadership election